Bajua Union is a union parishad of Dacope Upazila in Khulna District of Bangladesh.

Geography
The area of Bajua Union is 30.58 square kilometers.

References

Unions of Dacope Upazila
Populated places in Khulna Division
Populated places in Khulna District